Macaria banksianae, the jack pine looper, is a moth of the family Geometridae. It is found in North America.

The larva feeds on Pinus banksiana.

References 

Macariini
Moths described in 1974